The 1912 Wellington City mayoral election was part of the New Zealand local elections held that same year. In 1911, elections were held for the Mayor of Wellington plus other local government positions. Thomas Wilford, the incumbent Mayor, resigned due to ill health and did not contest the ensuing election. David McLaren was elected to office as the new Mayor of Wellington, beating three other contenders and becoming the city's first Labour Mayor. The polling was conducted using the standard first-past-the-post electoral method.

Background
Thomas Wilford had been Mayor of Wellington since his election in 1910. An ailing Wilford stood for re-election in 1911 and was unopposed for office. However, his illness worsened and he almost died after complications during an operation for appendicitis from which his health was to never truly recover. Wilford was forced to travel to England for medical treatment. For several months councillor John Smith had acted as Mayor on his behalf before Wilford formally resigned. Smith decided to stand for the position proper himself in the ensuing election. After serving for 11 years as a Wellington City Councillor and 12 years as a member of the Hospital Board, David McLaren stood for the mayoralty.

Results
The following table gives the election results:

Outcome
As a result of his victory, McLaren became the first Labour mayor of a major city in New Zealand. Due to McLaren's win at the polls for mayor his seat on the city council was declared vacant. A by-election was held for it a month later where his colleague in the labour movement, Edward Tregear, was successful in winning.

Notes

References

Mayoral elections in Wellington
1912 elections in New Zealand
Politics of the Wellington Region
1910s in Wellington